Sir Reginald Edwin Eyre (28 May 1924 – 27 January 2019) was a British Conservative Party politician.

Early life and career
Son of Edwin Eyre, a local government officer, and his wife Mary (née Moseley), a shopkeeper,
Eyre was educated at King Edward VI Camp Hill School, Birmingham and Emmanuel College, Cambridge before becoming a Birmingham solicitor, and admitted in 1950.

Career in politics
He contested Birmingham Northfield in 1959.  Eyre was elected Member of Parliament for Birmingham Hall Green at a 1965 by-election, and represented the seat until he retired in 1987.  During the Edward Heath and Margaret Thatcher governments, he served as Lord Commissioner of the Treasury, Comptroller of the Household, and junior Environment (Housing and Construction), and Trade and Transport Minister. He was also a vice-chairman of the Conservative Party.

Eyre died in January 2019 at the age of 94.  His daughter, from his second marriage, Hermione Eyre, is an editor at the London Evening Standard, and a novelist.  She is married to Conservative MP Alex Burghart.

References

External links 
 

1924 births
2019 deaths
Conservative Party (UK) MPs for English constituencies
Knights Bachelor
Politicians awarded knighthoods
UK MPs 1964–1966
UK MPs 1966–1970
UK MPs 1970–1974
UK MPs 1974
UK MPs 1974–1979
UK MPs 1979–1983
UK MPs 1983–1987
People educated at King Edward VI Camp Hill School for Boys